The LAX West Intermodal Transportation Facility (also known as the West ITF or the LAX Economy Parking facility) is a large parking structure with a kiss and ride area and access to the LAX City Bus Center and nearby hotels.

The four-story,  facility cost  to build and opened on October 19, 2021.

History  
Construction on the West ITF began in summer of 2019 with a groundbreaking on July 11, 2019.

The West ITF opened to the public on October 19, 2021, and will temporarily use buses to transport customers between the airport and the facility.

In 2022, Los Angeles World Airports' Security & Badging Office will move into a  space on the ground floor. By moving to a centralized location, employees will be able to utilize public transportation and the APM train system to take care of their badging needs, helping reduce traffic congestion on local streets.

People Mover service

Station layout

Hours and frequency 
The APM is expected to operate 24 hours a day. During peak hours (9 a.m. to 11 p.m.) trains will arrive every two minutes.

References 

LAX Automated People Mover stations
Los Angeles International Airport
Railway stations scheduled to open in 2023
Westchester, Los Angeles